The Campaign Medal (Spanish: Medalla de Campaña ) is a Spanish permanent military decoration. The medal is awarded to members of the Spanish Armed Forces, Allied forces and civilians participating in foreign military campaigns without international military decorations. It was created on 25 May 2018.

External links
 Royal Decree 336/2018 Campaign Medal of Spain Spanish Official Journal (Acceded 24 June 2018)